Dondurma is the common word in Turkish for all kinds of ice cream that is often used to refer to Turkish mastic ice cream in English. It typically includes the ingredients cream, whipped cream, salep (ground-up tuber of an orchid), mastic (plant resin), and sugar. It is believed to originate from the city and region of Kahramanmaraş, and hence is also known as Maraş ice cream.

Description
Two qualities distinguish Turkish ice cream: hard texture and resistance to melting, brought about by inclusion of the thickening agents salep, a flour made from the root of the early purple orchid, and mastic, a resin that imparts chewiness.

The Kahramanmaraş region is known for maraş dondurması, a variety which contains distinctly more salep than usual. Tough and sticky, it is sometimes eaten with a knife and fork.

Consumption and culture

Dondurma is commonly sold from both street vendors' carts and store fronts, where the mixture is churned regularly with long-handled paddles to keep it workable. Vendors often tease the customer by serving the ice cream cone on a stick, and then taking away the dondurma with the stick by rotating it around before finally giving it to the customer. This sometimes results in misunderstandings among customers unfamiliar with the practice, but usually will add more ice cream to compensate if a customer fails. They often wear traditional clothing of the Ottoman period.

In some places in Turkey it is customary to treat the ice cream like a döner kebab and cut the servings with a butcher knife.

As of 2010, the average rate of consumption in Turkey was 2.8 liters of ice cream per person per year (compared to the United States at 14.2 liters per person  and world consumption leader Australia at 17.9 liters in 2010).

Some Turks believe that cold foods, such as ice cream, will cause illnesses – such as sore throats and the common cold; it is held that consumption of warm liquid while consuming ice cream will counteract these effects.

The popularity of salepli dondurma has caused a decline of wild orchids in the region and led to a ban on exports of salep.

Α distinct variation of dondurma is also consumed in Greece, especially in the north of the country, where it is called "dudurmas" or "kaimaki".

See also
 Kaymak
 Booza
 Kulfi
 List of dairy products

Notes

References

External links
 Ice Cream of Kahramanmaraş
 SBS food - Dondurma (Turkish Ice-cream)

Mastic ice creams
Turkish desserts
Greek desserts
Turkish words and phrases
Turkish inventions